Tristan from the kindred Hahót ( or Terestyén; died after 1267) was a Hungarian noble, who served as Count of the Heralds in 1255.

Biography
Tristan was born into the Buzád branch of the gens Hahót as the son of powerful baron Buzád II Hahót, who later entered the Dominican Order, and after his murder by invading Mongols, now he is considered as a Christian martyr by the Catholic Church. Tristan had three brothers: Buzád III, Csák I and Lancelot (Lankrét). Tristan had two sons from his unidentified spouse, including Michael III, who became patron of the Premonstratensian monastery at Rajk in 1275, receiving the right from the sons of Csák I.

His typarium is one of the most notable examples of seal usage of aristocrats in medieval Hungary. He inherited his seal from his father, depicting head of an ox, while Tristan added letters to his seal in order to distinguish himself from his distant relatives, the Arnold branch of the clan. In order to protect his possessions at Muraköz (today: Međimurje, Croatia), he built a timber fortification, and the nearby village was still called as Terestyéntornya (lit. "Tristan's Tower") in the 15th century.

References

Sources

 
 
 

13th-century Hungarian people
Tristan